The Solo–Yogyakarta–YIA Kulonprogo toll road or Joglo toll road is a toll road under construction in Indonesia that connects Surakarta urban area in Central Java with Yogyakarta urban area in Special Region of Yogyakarta. The toll road is part of the Trans-Java Toll Road. Construction of this toll road has begun in 2020 from the direction of Solo. Despite its name, the toll road terminus will not located within Surakarta and Yogyakarta, but in nearby Boyolali Regency and Sleman Regency.

The toll road was built elevated along the Yogyakarta Northern Ring Road (except at the intersection of Jalan Nyi Tjondrolukito/Palagan Tentara Pelajar near Yogya Kembali Monument which will be made at-grade), then continues along the Mataram Canal until it reaches the interchange in the Maguwoharjo area. The toll road will continue to Yogyakarta International Airport (YIA) which stretches from the Sleman interchange for 30.77 km. It is expected that the toll road will facilitate access from YIA to Yogyakarta.

History

To support the government's program in providing toll road infrastructure in the southern region of Java Island, PT. Jogjasolo Marga Makmur (PT. JMM) which is a Toll Road Business Entity (BUJT) a consortium of four companies, namely PT. Daya Mulia Turangga (DMT)–PT. Gamma Group–PT. Jasa Marga (Persero) Tbk and PT. Adhi Karya (Persero) Tbk (ADHI).

PT. Jogjasolo Marga Makmur has won the concession investment tender, and signed a toll road concession agreement contract for the Solo–Yogyakarta–YIA Kulon Progo section, with the Toll Road Regulatory Agency (BPJT) on 9 September 2020. The Solo–Yogyakarta–YIA Kulon Progo toll road section itself is one of the National Strategy Projects (PSN) based on Presidential Regulation No. 3 of 2016, Presidential Regulation No. 56 of 2018 and the latest amendment to Presidential Regulation No. 109 of 2020. The realization of the Solo–Yogyakarta–YIA–Kulon Progo toll road is considered special because it connects two cultural cities. namely Surakarta and Yogyakarta. In addition, this project has received high attention from the central government and regional governments because it is considered very strategic as a solution for mobility and distribution efficiency in the southern region of Java Island.

Section 
This toll road is divided into three, namely:

Exits

See also

References

External links

Toll roads in Indonesia
Transport in Central Java
Transport in the Special Region of Yogyakarta